Katherine Blair or Kathryn Blair may refer to:

Katie Blair (born 1987), American model and TV presenter
Kathryn Blair, daughter of former British Prime Minister, Tony Blair
Katherine Blair, character in The Night Flier (film)
Kathryn Blair, pseudonym of Rosalind Brett (author)